Juha-Matti Ruuskanen (born 24 July 1984) is a Finnish former ski jumper who competed from 2002 to 2012, mainly at Continental Cup level. His lone World Cup victory was in a team event at the ski flying hill in Oberstdorf on 15 February 2009.

References

1984 births
Finnish male ski jumpers
Living people
People from Kuopio
Sportspeople from North Savo
21st-century Finnish people